Antonina Prusinowska, or Pruszanowska, or Prosinowska (fl. 1767), was a Polish stage actress. She was the first native actress in Poland.

Prusinowska was employed as a member of the pioneer group of actors engaged upon the foundation of the National Theatre, Warsaw. Prior to this, only foreign theater companies, normally French and Italian, had been active in Poland, and the foundation of the national theater also signified the start point of the first professional Polish theater, and the actors employed at the newly founded theater was thus the first native professional actors in Poland. With no training, they were tutored by the theater direction, the playwrights and enthusiastic noble amateurs. 

She participated in the inauguration performance of the National Theatre, Natrętów, on 19 November 1765, likely in the role of Lucyndę. Thus, she and her female colleague, Wiktoria Leszczyńska, became historic as the first native actresses in Poland. A critic mentioned, that the two actresses were both noblewomen who had abandoned their husbands, and that they both acted well, if somewhat hesitant. They were both active at the theater for two years. Prusinowska were given the highest salary as the theater's leading lady, and acted in comedies by F. Bohomolec before her retirement in 1767.

References 

 Laurence Senelick: National Theatre in Northern and Eastern Europe, 1746-1900, 1991
 Źródło: Słownik Biograficzny Teatru Polskiego 1765-1965, PWN Warszawa 1973

Polish women singers
18th-century Polish–Lithuanian opera singers
Polish stage actresses
18th-century Polish nobility
18th-century Polish–Lithuanian actresses
Year of birth unknown